Lucky Strikes is an album led by saxophonist Lucky Thompson recorded in 1964 and released on the Prestige label.

Reception

AllMusic awarded the album 4½ stars with its review by Scott Yanow calling it, "a perfect introduction to the talents of the underrated saxophonist Lucky Thompson... the quality is quite high. Thompson's soprano solos in particular are quite memorable".

Track listing 
All compositions by Lucky Thompson except as noted
 "In a Sentimental Mood" (Duke Ellington, Irving Mills) – 5:49  
 "Fly With the Wind" – 4:01  
 "Mid-Nite Oil" – 5:08  
 "Reminiscent" – 4:04  
 "Mumba Neua" – 4:47  
 "I Forgot to Remember" – 6:36  
 "Prey-Loot" – 4:05  
 "Invitation" (Bronisław Kaper) – 4:55

Personnel 
Lucky Thompson – tenor saxophone, soprano saxophone  
Hank Jones – piano
Richard Davis – bass
Connie Kay – drums

References 

Lucky Thompson albums
1965 albums
Prestige Records albums
Albums produced by Don Schlitten
Albums recorded at Van Gelder Studio